Dum Spiro Spero (stylized as DUM SPIRO SPERO) is the eighth studio album by Japanese heavy metal band Dir En Grey, released on August 2, 2011 in the U.S., and in Japan on August 3.

The album's three singles, "Hageshisa to, Kono Mune no Naka de Karamitsuita Shakunetsu no Yami", "Lotus" and "Different Sense", have all been remastered from their original releases. "Rasetsukoku" is a re-recording of the original song found on their 2000 album Macabre.

Release and promotion 
It was released in both a single-CD edition, a deluxe edition digipak with two bonus tracks ("Rasetsukoku" and "Amon (Symphonic Ver.)"), and a limited edition featuring the deluxe digipak, a DVD and two LPs. This featured alternative versions of songs from the regular version of the album, remixes, interviews, studio footage, and more.

Music videos were released for all three singles; "Hageshisa to, Kono Mune no Naka de Karamitsuita Shakunetsu no Yami", "Lotus" and "Different Sense".

Artwork 
The album art was designed by the band's long-time artist Koji Yoda. This art-cover probably represents Tara, the "Mother of Liberation" in Tibetan Buddhism. The bamboo scenery is very meaningful to the band. According to guitarist Die, "the bamboo conveys the idea of sacredness and serenity [...]. Ultimately, it means to keep faith and hope alive even though you are living the worst: While I breath, I hope."

Critical reception 

Dum Spiro Spero was met with positive reviews from music critics. At Metacritic (a review aggregator site which assigns a normalized rating out of 100 from music critics), based on 8 critics, the album has received a score of 74/100, which indicates "Generally favorable reviews".

In his review for AllMusic, Thom Jurek wrote that "Dir en Grey are a band in their own genre at this point, and Dum Spiro Spero is the farthest-reaching testament to establish that as fact more than opinion." He also acknowledged the wide variety of influences on the album, ranging from death metal and power metal to pop music, praising comparing vocalist Kyo's range to Mike Patton. Rock Sound described it as a "satisfyingly challenging, perpetually writhing musical beast".

PopMatters' Dane Prokofiev noted in a positive review that "their music is eclectic and hard to classify into any one subgenre—except that they have the added fangirl-ish oomph of flashy appearances, thanks to their visual-kei roots". Like Jurek, he praised Kyo as a gifted singer, particularly for his range. He also singled out bassist Toshiya as deserving of praise for his performance on Dum Spiro Spero, "as his throbbing bass lines complement the technical guitar riffs well by adding a groovy kind of bad-ass attitude to the overall feel of the music. Without him, the guitar melodies of Kaoru and Die would most certainly sound naked and hollow."

Track listing

Release history

Charting

References

Dir En Grey albums
2011 albums